William Tackaert (born 9 August 1956) is a Belgian former racing cyclist. He rode in five editions of the Tour de France between 1979 and 1983. He most notably won the 1983 E3 Harelbeke and the 1985 Kuurne–Brussels–Kuurne.

Major results

1979
 1st Stage 1 Driedaagse van De Panne-Koksijde
 2nd Nokere Koerse
1980
 1st Stage 2a Étoile des Espoirs
 2nd Omloop Mandel-Leie-Schelde
 4th Ronde van Limburg
 5th GP Stad Zottegem
 8th Paris–Roubaix
 8th Scheldeprijs
1981
 1st Stage 3a Critérium du Dauphiné Libéré
 2nd Nationale Sluitingprijs
 3rd Stadsprijs Geraardsbergen
 7th Druivenkoers-Overijse
 8th Overall Tour of Belgium
 10th Omloop Het Volk
1982
 1st Nokere Koerse
 3rd Omloop van de Westhoek
 6th Overall Tour de Luxembourg
 8th Grand Prix Cerami
1983
 1st E3 Harelbeke
 1st Omloop Mandel-Leie-Schelde
 2nd Grand Prix de Denain
 3rd Overall Four Days of Dunkirk
 3rd Ronde van Limburg
 4th Overall Driedaagse van De Panne-Koksijde
 6th Le Samyn
1984
 2nd Overall Tour de Luxembourg
1st Stage 1
 2nd La Flèche Wallonne
 3rd Druivenkoers-Overijse
 3rd Grand Prix Cerami
 4th Circuit des Frontières
 4th Nokere Koerse
 5th Le Samyn
 6th Amstel Gold Race
 6th E3 Harelbeke
 8th Grote Prijs Jef Scherens
 10th Scheldeprijs
1985
 1st Kuurne–Brussels–Kuurne
 2nd Overall Tour de Luxembourg
 2nd Brussels–Ingooigem
 2nd Binche–Tournai–Binche
 2nd Circuit des Frontières
 2nd Omloop Schelde-Durme
 3rd Overall Herald Sun Tour
1st Stage 4
 3rd Omloop van het Leiedal
 4th Grand Prix Cerami
 4th Le Samyn
 5th E3 Harelbeke
 5th Gent–Wevelgem
 5th Scheldeprijs
 5th Dwars door België
 9th Overall Driedaagse van De Panne-Koksijde
1st Stage 1a
1986
 3rd Le Samyn
 4th Druivenkoers-Overijse
 7th Nokere Koerse
 8th Grand Prix Impanis-Van Petegem

Grand Tour general classification results timeline

References

External links
 

1956 births
Living people
Belgian male cyclists
People from Zele
Cyclists from East Flanders